Roberta Beltrame (born 19 April 1938) is an Italian former tennis player.

Born in Ferrara, Beltrame was a seven-time winner of the Italian Tennis Championships, twice in women's doubles and five times in mixed doubles. During the 1960s she made main draw appearances at the French Championships and Wimbledon. She married tennis coach Gerardo Bonardi.

References

External links
 

1938 births
Living people
Italian female tennis players
Sportspeople from Ferrara
20th-century Italian women